Qaarsut Airport  is an airport in Qaarsut, a settlement on the Nuussuaq Peninsula in Avannaata municipality in northwestern Greenland. It is a primary airport with a gravel runway, capable of serving STOL aircraft of Air Greenland in all seasons. There is a small cafeteria in the tiny arrivals/departures hall.

Overview 

The airport thus functions as a mini-hub for Uummannaq, with the terminal building labelled 'Uummannaq', regardless of its actual location, registration, documentation, and existing booking systems.

The decision to build the airport in Qaarsut was intended to solve the bottleneck on the Ilulissat-Uummannaq route (164 km), until then operated by Air Greenland with Sikorsky S-61N helicopters. Acquired in 1965, they are the oldest machines in the fleet of the airline, still in operation year-round in southern Greenland and during wintertime in the Disko Bay area south of Qaarsut.

The bottleneck problem is considered unsolved, since passengers must still be shuttled between the airport and Uummannaq Heliport. The primary function of the airport as a local hub has unintended consequences for communities of northern Greenland. All flights to Qaanaaq Airport include a stopover in Upernavik Airport. In order to avoid an overnight layover in Upernavik, all Qaanaaq-bound passengers must travel via Qaarsut. Flights on the Ilulissat-Qaarsut route are often sold out, which given a single weekly flight to Qaanaaq leaves passengers unable to travel to or from the northern communities, resulting in resentment. As of 2017, it is possible to travel Ilulissat–Qaanaaq or opposite within a day with only one plane change in Upernavik without touching Qaarsut.

Proposals to close the airport have to date been rejected. Sunk costs, tourism potential for northwestern and northern Greenland, and the 2010 reinvigoration of the mining activities in Maamorilik northeast of Ukkusissat, as well as on Appat Island in the future−are the primary reasons for keeping the airport open.

Airlines and destinations

References

Airports in Greenland
Airports in the Arctic
Airports established in 1999
Uummannaq Fjord
1999 establishments in Greenland